Guruvayur–Thrissur section is a spur line functioning under Trivandrum railway division of Southern Railway zone. This is a single broad-gauge line which begins at Thrissur city and ends at Guruvayur in Thrissur district of Kerala. The  section was opened for traffic in the year 1994. The line connects the Cultural Capital of Kerala, Thrissur to the Temple Town of Kerala, Guruvayur, the fourth biggest temple in India in terms of the number of devotees per day.

History

In 1983, Kamalapati Tripathi, then Minister of Railways (India) announced the construction of Thrissur–Guruvayur–Kuttippuram section. But following stiff opposition from the local people, Kuttipuram was dropped. On 19 January 1985 Indian Railways officially notifies Guruvayur–Tanur line for construction as temple town is a notified pilgrimage area. Rajiv Gandhi, then Prime Minister of India in 1987 inaugurated the first alignment line of Guruvayur–Tanur section.

On 9 January 1994 the first phase of the Thrissur–Guruvayur section was inaugurated by Prime Minister of India, Narasimha Rao. On 17 December 1995, Suresh Kalmadi and then Chief Minister of Kerala Kannoth Karunakaran inaugurated the work for the Guruvayur–Kuttipuram line. But later Kuttipuram was dropped once more and Indian Railways in 1997 give the green signal for Guruvayur–Tanur line. 51.25 km Guruvayur–Tanur railway line survey report was submitted to Indian Railways in July 1998. The project was sanctioned in 1999. The final surveys were done for the Guruvayur–Tanur railway line in January 2003, which will cover 51 km. In October 2009, Guruvayur–Tirunavaya alignment was chosen by Indian Railways.

The project is in limbo ever since then. Successive Kerala Governments showed no interest to revive this project by paying fair compensation acquire land and handover to Indian Railways. People expected some announcement on this regard from PM Modi on his visit to the temple after 2019 Elections. But nothing happened. In all sense this project is a no beginner if implemented it would have been of great help to Malabar people and would have provided an alternative route between Kochi and Mangalore bypassing busy Shoranur.

One of the biggest ironies of this rail line is that the incomplete section passes through "Metro man" E. Sreedharan's native place.

References

†
Transport in Thrissur
Rail transport in Kerala
Economy of Thrissur
5 ft 6 in gauge railways in India
Railway lines opened in 1994
Transport in Guruvayur